Leptocneria reducta, the white cedar moth, is a moth of the subfamily Lymantriinae. The species was first described by Francis Walker in 1855. It is found in all of Australia, except Tasmania.

The wingspan is about 45 mm for females and 35 mm for males.

The larvae feed on Melia azedarach.

The caterpillars live communally. They come out of hiding in the evening when they swarm the tree trunk and the branches to get to the leaves, which they eat. The caterpillars feed communally until the tree becomes defoliated. At this point they will start searching for a new host, sometimes invading buildings in their search.

The caterpillars are covered in bristles, inducing an allergic reaction (urticaria) with some people.

References

Lymantriinae
Moths described in 1855